Zobida is a genus of moths in the subfamily Arctiinae.

Most species were previously placed in the genus Eilema.

Species
 Zobida avifex Kühne, 2010
 Zobida bipuncta (Hübner, [1824])
 Zobida colon (Möschler, 1872)
 Zobida trinitas (Strand, 1912)

References

  1965: A revision of the West African Eilemic moths, based on the male genitalia (Lep., Adrctidae, Lithosinae; incl. gena. Crocosia, Eilema, Lithosia, Pelosia, Phryganopsis a.o.):1–161.
 , 2010: Taxonomische Ergebnisse der bearbeitung der nachtfalterfauna des südlichen Afrikas (Lepidoptera: Noctuoidea). Esperiana Memoir 5: 433–456.
 , 2011: Lymantriinae and Arctiinae - Including Phylogeny and Check List of the Quadrifid Noctuoidea of Europe. Noctuidae Europaeae Volume 13: 1–448.

Lithosiina
Moth genera